Nicolas Amiouni is a Lebanese Rally driver, born on March 16, 1989, in Rabieh. He started his professional racing career in 2004, competing in the Lebanese go-kart championship and made his move to Rallying in 2010 as a member of Motortune Racing, participating in 7 Middle East Rally Championship rallies. Nicolas managed to clinch several notable positions during his rookie year.

In 2011 Nicolas continued his rallying career participating in numerous local and regional events claiming several wins and noteworthy finishes. His season was highlighted by finishing 3rd in the Lebanese Rally Championship, and winning the Group N in the Jordan WRC.

In 2012 Nicolas participated in the Lebanese Rally Championship and the National Jordanian Rallies claiming his first overall win in the first rally of the season.

In 2013 Nicolas focused his efforts on the Lebanese Motorsports specifically Rallying and Hill climbs. Nicolas won the Group N Lebanese Hill Climb Championship  and claimed the 2nd position in the Lebanese Rally Championship.

In 2014 Nicolas expanded his program participating in the WRC's Drive Dmack competing in 6 rounds of the world rally championship: Portugal, Poland, Finland, Germany and Spain. Locally Nicolas Managed to win the Rally of Lebanon and won the Group N Lebanese Rally Championship.

In 2015 Nicolas participated in 3 WRC rounds of the Drive Dmack (Portugal, Poland and Finland, in addition he managed to finish 2nd in the Rally of Lebanon while winning his category Gr.RC2/N4.

Unfortunately in 2016 Nicolas did not manage to get proper sponsorship in order to participate in any local or international events, but his love for competition made him return to the driver seat in 2017 and win his class again RC2/N4 and finish 2nd in the Spring Rally (1st round of the Lebanese Rally Championship).

In 2018 Nicolas decided to tackle the Lebanese Rally Championship once again and managed to win (RC2/N4) the first round (Spring Rally) while finishing 4th overall. Nicolas had some mechanical issues that forced to retire from the Gr.N leadership in Jezzine Rally (2nd round LRC). Due to lack of sponsorship Nicolas had to suspend his LRC campaign for 2018 until further notice.

Career results

WRC results

Drive DMACK Cup results

References

External links 
 eWRC Profile
 Facebook Page

Rally drivers
Living people
Lebanese racing drivers
1989 births